2019 Chinese FA Super Cup (Chinese: 2019中国足球协会超级杯) was the 17th Chinese FA Super Cup, an annual football match contested by the winners of the previous season's Chinese Super League and FA Cup competitions. The match was played between Shanghai SIPG, champions of the 2018 Chinese Super League, and Beijing Sinobo Guoan, the winner of the 2018 Chinese FA Cup. Policy of foreign players and U-23 domestic players was executed in the tournament. At most three foreign players could play in the match while at least one domestic player who is under the age of 23 (born on or after 1 January 1996) must be in the starting eleven and at least three U-23 players must play in this match.

Shanghai SIPG won the title for the first time after a 2–0 win over Beijing Sinobo Guoan with goals from Wang Shenchao and Lü Wenjun. Beijing Sinobo Guoan's Hou Yongyong was substituted on in the 71st minute of the match as a U-23 domestic player, which made him the first naturalized player to appear for a Chinese club.

Match

Details

|-
|}

See also
2018 Chinese Super League
2018 Chinese FA Cup

References

FA Super Cup
February 2019 sports events in China